Allan Collins (4 November 1919 – 19 September 2006) was an Australian rules footballer who played with Footscray in the VFL during the 1940s.

Collins topped Footscray's goalkicking in 1943 with 40 goals and won that year's Best and Fairest award. He had previously been their leading goalkicker in 1941 when he managed 35 goals. He was the elder brother of the better-known Jack Collins.

References

External links

1919 births
2006 deaths
Australian rules footballers from Victoria (Australia)
Western Bulldogs players
Yarraville Football Club players
Charles Sutton Medal winners